Roger De Clercq (2 September 1930 – 24 August 2014) was a Belgian racing cyclist. Professional from 1954 to 1968, he won 68 races in his career; including the Belgian National Cyclo-cross Championships three times, in 1960, 1962 and 1964, and a silver medal at the 1964 UCI Cyclo-cross World Championships. He was the brother of René De Clercq and the uncle of Mario De Clercq, also professional cyclists.

Major results

Cyclo-cross

1953
 2nd National Championships
 10th UCI World Championships
1954
 2nd National Championships
 7th UCI World Championships
1955
 2nd National Championships
1956
 2nd National Championships
1957
 3rd National Championships
 10th UCI World Championships
1958
 2nd National Championships
1959
 1st Noordzeecross
 1st Zonhoven
1960
 1st  National Championships
 8th UCI World Championships
1961
 5th UCI World Championships
1962
 1st  National Championships
 1st Zonhoven
 4th UCI World Championships
1963
 5th UCI World Championships
1964
 1st  National Championships
 2nd  UCI World Championships
1965
 1st Noordzeecross
 4th UCI World Championships

Road
1954
 1st Petegem-aan-de-Leie
 1st Stage 8 Route de France
1955
 2nd Petegem-aan-de-Leie
1956
 2nd Nokere Koerse
1958
 10th Elfstedenronde

References

External links

1930 births
2014 deaths
Belgian male cyclists
Cyclo-cross cyclists
Belgian cyclo-cross champions
People from Zwalm
Cyclists from East Flanders